Arthur Lachance (June 22, 1868 – March 1, 1945) was a Canadian politician and member of the Liberal Party who served as an MP for the riding of Quebec-Centre from 1905 to 1917.

Born in Quebec City, Quebec, Lachance was educated at the Christian Brothers' School, Quebec Seminary and Laval University. A crown attorney, crown prosecutor and lawyer, he was first elected to Parliament by acclamation in a 1905 by-election in the electoral district of Quebec-Centre after the current MP, Albert Malouin, was appointed a Puisne Judge  of the Superior Court of Quebec, Arthabasca District. A Liberal, he was re-elected in 1908 and 1911.

References

 
 The Canadian Parliament; biographical sketches and photo-engravures of the senators and members of the House of Commons of Canada. Being the tenth Parliament, elected November 3, 1904

1868 births
1945 deaths
Liberal Party of Canada MPs
Members of the House of Commons of Canada from Quebec
Politicians from Quebec City
Université Laval alumni